CHSLD is a Canadian short documentary film, directed by François Delisle and released in 2020. The film is a portrait of Delisle's mother and her life in a nursing home. It should not be confused with CHSLD mon amour, a separate film directed by Danic Champoux and released the same year.

The film premiered on September 5, 2020 at the Off-Courts short film festival in Trouville-sur-Mer, France, and had its Canadian premiere at the 2020 Montreal International Documentary Festival.

It received a Canadian Screen Award nomination for Best Short Documentary at the 9th Canadian Screen Awards.

References

External links

2020 films
2020 short documentary films
Canadian short documentary films
Films directed by François Delisle
2020s French-language films
French-language Canadian films
2020s Canadian films